HMS Trafalgar was one of two s commissioned in 1890 and 1891, the other being . The ship was designed as an improved version of existing battleships with greater displacement and a thicker armoured belt amidships. Trafalgar saw active service as a battleship from 1890 to 1897 and from 1909 to 1911 when she was sold. Between these two periods as a combatant, Trafalgar served as a guardship and as a drill ship.

Design
However, they sacrificed a full armoured belt for greater thickness amidships in a partial belt.

As originally designed, Trafalgar was to have displaced 11,940 tons, and carried a secondary armament of ten guns of  calibre, disposed in the broadside battery. This in turn led to the main belt being immersed to a deeper level than had been intended, with a potential decrease in defensive effect in combat.

In October 1896 the secondary battery of  guns was replaced by a more powerful battery of six  quick firers.

It was thought possible that firing along the keel line might cause structural damage; tests requested by the Chief Constructor, however, showed the potential damage to be minimal.

Together with the reduced freeboard as compared to earlier ships, this had a significantly adverse effect on her handling; as she spent her active service in relatively calm water in the Mediterranean, however, this defect was of minimal importance.

Service history

Trafalgar was completed, except for her main armament, in only three years and three months. The delay in the production of her guns meant that she was not commissioned, as second flagship Mediterranean Fleet until 2 April 1890. She served in this position until October 1897, when she paid off at Portsmouth. She was recommissioned, and stayed there as guardship until August 1902, taking part in the fleet review held at Spithead on 16 August 1902 for the coronation of King Edward VII. Captain George Anson Primrose was appointed in command in December 1899. She remained thereafter in reserve until 1907, when she went to Sheerness to serve as a drill ship for crews of turrets and of submerged torpedo tubes. In April 1909 she reverted to active service with the fourth division of the Home Fleet, based at the Nore. She was sold on 9 March 1911.

Notes and references

Bibliography
K. McBride, Nile and Trafalgar, The Last British Ironclads, in Warship 2000–2001, Conways Maritime Press
D. K. Brown, Warrior to Dreadnought, Warship Development 1860–1906, 
Oscar Parkes, British Battleships

External links

Maritimequest HMS Trafalgar Photo Gallery

Trafalgar-class battleships
Ships built in Portsmouth
Victorian-era battleships of the United Kingdom
1887 ships